Commander James Cathal Boyd McManus  (a.k.a. Tom, 11 March 1891 – 1972) was an officer in the Royal Australian Navy. He commanded the Coastwatchers from 1943 until the end of World War II.

Early life 
Born to Margaret Helen Alexandrina Boyd and Arthur Corrigan McManus on 11 March 1891, McManus' brother Rondal Arthur was born two years later in 1893. The family lived in Echuca, Victoria in Australia.

McManus' father died suddenly in 1894. His mother Margaret took her infant children James and Rondal to live near their uncle and aunt, John Reed McManus and Caroline McManus, in Neutral Bay in New South Wales. 

McManus' uncle, John, sailed with the China Navigation Company and inspired the young James McManus' lifelong love of the sea.

Family 
McManus married Vera Spedding in 1915. They had two children, Terence and June. 

McManus was widowed in 1950 and married Louise Zimmerman in 1965.

He is a cousin to Emily MacManus.

Service 
McManus was an officer in the Royal Australian Navy in World War I and World War II. 

During World War II he served in Naval Intelligence. The Director of Naval Intelligence was Commander R. B. M. Long. McManus was stationed at HMAS Cerberus (naval base), HMAS Yarra, HMAS Penguin, HMAS Melville (naval base), HMAS Basilisk and HMAS Moreton. 

McManus took command of the Coastwatchers in 1943 after Commander Eric Feldt succumbed to illness. Feldt describes him in his book The Coast Watchers as Long's "... most experienced man ..." and as:
 

The change of command came at a sensitive time, only months before the MV Krait made its mission into Singapore Harbour for Operation Jaywick. However, as Walter Lord notes in his book Lonely Vigil: Coastwatchers of the Solomons, McManus was:

McManus was awarded an OBE in 1946.

His ashes were scattered from the MV Krait after his death in 1972.

References 

People from Echuca
People from Victoria (Australia)
1891 births
1972 deaths
Australian military personnel of World War I
Royal Australian Navy personnel of World War II
Officers of the Order of the British Empire
Royal Australian Navy officers
Solomon Islands in World War II
Special forces of Australia